Peter Ball may refer to:

Peter Ball (bishop) (1932–2019), former Bishop of Lewes and of Gloucester and convicted sex offender 
Peter Ball (physician) (died 1675), English physician
Peter Eugene Ball (born 1943), English sculptor
Peter Ball (barrister) (died 1680), English lawyer, courtier, and member of parliament 
Peter William Ball (born 1932), English-born botanist, plant collector, and plant taxonomist